Livermore (formerly Livermorès, Livermore Ranch, and Nottingham) is a city in Alameda County, California. With a 2020 population of 87,955, Livermore is the most populous city in the Tri-Valley, giving its name to the Livermore Valley. It is located on the eastern edge of California's San Francisco Bay Area. The current mayor is John Marchand.

Livermore was platted and registered on November 4, 1869, as a railroad town by William Mendenhall and named for Robert Livermore, Mendenhall’s friend and a local rancher who settled in the area in the 1840s. It is the home of the Lawrence Livermore National Laboratory, for which the chemical element livermorium is named (and thus, placing the city's name in the periodic table). It is also the California site of Sandia National Laboratories, which is headquartered in Albuquerque, New Mexico. Its south side is home to local vineyards, and its downtown district is being redeveloped.

The United States Census Bureau defines an urban area of Tri-Valley-area cities, with Livermore as the principal city: the Livermore–Pleasanton–Dublin, CA urban area had a 2020 population of 240,381, making it the 167th largest in the United States.

History

Pre-Contact 
The valley and upland areas, where contemporary Livermore is located, was home to Chochenyo speaking peoples. As a group, these people are considered Ohlone Costonoan with distinct cultural affiliation in contrast to and closely bordering the Bay Miwok to the north and the Valley Yokuts to the east.  Four tribelets, the Yulien, Ssaoam, Ssouyn, and the Pelnen, occupied the valley floor with territory extending into the hills. Semi-permanent villages were located near water drainages at the valley floor within the current urban limits of Livermore with seasonal camps in the surrounding uplands.

1700s 
A Spanish expedition led by Pedro Fages skirted the western edge of Livermore Valley in 1772. Shortly afterwards, the Spanish Mission of San Jose was founded in 1797 on the slopes of what is modern day Fremont. Mission San Jose viewed the people and land stretching to the east as under their control. Livermore Valley was called the Valley of San Jose by the Friars and actively recruited native peoples of the valley into the mission system. In contrast, the valley was also used as a staging area for raids on Mission San Jose by neighboring tribes in this early period and beyond.

1800s 
During the first seven years of the 1800s, five hundred and two individuals were baptized at Mission San Jose from the four tribelets in the Livermore Valley. In this time, Spanish military conducted raids throughout the East Bay using the valley as a natural corridor for movement. Deaths from measles outbreaks were recorded in Mission San Jose in 1806 which forced recruiting beyond the Livermore Valley and into the Altamont range. The Livermore-Amador Valley from 1800 to about 1837 was primarily used as grazing land for the Mission San Jose's growing herds of cattle, sheep and horses. The valley helped San Jose Mission emerge as one of the more wealthy Spanish enclaves. As a result of the secularization of the mission system, in 1839, two large ranchos were created that encompassed the Livermore Valley; Rancho Las Positas and Rancho Valle de San Jose. Many Native groups left the San Jose Mission during this period and reestablished themselves in communities in the East Bay, including the Livermore Valley.

Rancho Las Positas 
The  Rancho Las Positas grant, which includes most of Livermore, was made to ranchers Robert Livermore and Jose Noriega in 1839. Most land grants were given with little or no cost to the recipients. Robert Livermore (1799-1858) was a British citizen who had jumped from a British merchant sailing ship stopping in Monterey, California, in 1822. He became a naturalized Mexican citizen who had converted to Catholicism in 1823 as was required for citizenship and legal residence. After working for a number of years as a majordomo (ranch foreman), Livermore married on 5 May 1838 the widow Maria Josefa de Jesus Higuera (1815–1879), daughter of Jose Loreto Higuera, grantee of Rancho Los Tularcitos, at the Mission San José. Livermore, after he got his rancho in 1839, was as interested in viticulture and horticulture as he was in cattle and horses, despite the fact that about the only source of income was the sale of cow hides and tallow. In the early 1840s he moved his family to the Livermore valley to his new rancho as the second non-Indian family to settle in the Livermore valley area, and after building a home he was the first in the area in 1846 to direct the planting of vineyards and orchards of pears and olives. Typical of most early rancho dwellings, the first building on his ranch was an adobe on Las Positas Creek near the western end of today's Las Positas Road. After the Americans took control of California in 1847 and gold was discovered in 1848, he started making money by selling California longhorn cattle to the thousands of hungry California Gold Rush miners who soon arrived. The non-Indian population skyrocketed, and cattle were suddenly worth much more than the $1.00-$3.00 their hides could bring. It is believed to be the first wooden building in the Livermore Tri-Valley.

During the Gold Rush, Livermore's ranch became a popular "first day" stopping point for prospectors and businessmen leaving San Francisco or San Jose and headed for Sacramento and the Mother Lode gold country. Most horse traffic went by way of Altamont Pass just east of Livermore. Robert Livermore was a very accommodating host and welcomed nearly all that stopped by with lodging and meals.

Robert Livermore died in 1858 and was buried at Mission San Jose before the establishment of the town that bears his name. His ranch included much of the present-day city.

Founding of Livermore 
People other than Robert Livermore were also living in the Livermore Valley at the time. The first significant settlement in the valley was Laddsville, a small settlement of about 75 that had grown up around the hotel established by Alphonso Ladd in 1864 on what is now Junction Avenue. William Mendenhall was a third man who owned property there at the time. Sometime in 1869, he established a 100 acre townsite on his property, naming it after Robert Livermore, who had first met Livermore while marching through the valley with John C. Fremont's California Battalion in 1846 as they were recruited to occupy the surrendering Californio towns captured by the U.S. Navy's Pacific Squadron. He donated 20 acres of this land to the Western Pacific Railroad, which in September 1869 completed its railroad connection from Alameda Terminal to Sacramento over the nearby Altamont Pass in the east and Niles Canyon on the west with a stop and station on the land donated by Mendenhall and adjacent to the town he'd laid out. The railroad greatly accelerated Livermore's growth, and the town was officially incorporated by the state as a city on April 1, 1876.

By 1870 the Western Pacific had been absorbed by the Central Pacific Railroad as part of the First transcontinental railroad. Central Pacific was later acquired by the Southern Pacific Railroad and then the Union Pacific Railroad, which owns the tracks through town today, although these are primarily the tracks of the "second" Western Pacific Railroad that was founded in 1903 and absorbed into the UP in 1983.

The Livermore Ranch post office, in Robert Livermore's home, operated from 1851 to 1853. The official U.S. post office in Livermore opened on Jan. 15, 1869. It was called Nottingham in the mistaken belief that Robert Livermore had been born in Nottingham, England. (He was actually born in Springfield, Essex, England.) The post office's name was changed to Livermore on July 7, 1870.

Early Livermore 
Private grade schools were operating in Livermore from the 1860s on. The Livermore Collegiate Institute was founded in 1870, and Union High School (later called Livermore High School) graduated its first class of students in 1896. Petroleum was discovered near Livermore and become a valuable asset. Extensive coal deposits were mined near Corral Hollow by the Livermore Coal Company. In September 1871 Laddsville mostly burned down, and the people rebuilt their homes and businesses nearer the railroad in what is now downtown Livermore. Until 1875 the townspeople enjoyed bull fights in a small bullring on many Sundays, and on other occasions a captured grizzly bear might be pitted against a longhorn bull. Apparently, roping a grizzly was thought then to be a great sport. By 1876 the town had grown and a fire company, churches, a bank, and a library were built. Livermore was officially incorporated by the state as a city on April 1, 1876, its original city limits being the line a block north of 1st Street on the north and Livermore Avenue (then Lizzie Street) on the east. The part of the west side north of 5th Street was bounded by Q Street, and the part of it south of 5th Street by I Street. The part of the south side east of I Street was bounded by 6th Street, and the part of it west of I Street by 5th Street.

During Livermore's early years, it was well known for large hotels that graced the downtown street corners, before new buildings replaced them. Livermore after the 1880s is also notable for the Wente Vineyards, Concannon Vineyard, Cresta Blanca Winery and many other wineries. Since it has a Mediterranean climate, gravelly soil, warm days and cool nights, it was a good location to grow wine grapes. By 1880 the extensive winter wheat and hay crop lands were being replaced by vineyards. Extensive chromite deposits were found and exploited for a time. In 1885, the Remillard Brick Company was producing an extensive line of bricks and employing over 100 men. A telephone line connected Livermore to Arroyo Valley by 1886, and electric lights were introduced by 1889. Livermore originally had a Boot Hill called the Old Knoll Cemetery.

1900s 
During the late 19th century and early 20th century, the Livermore Valley attracted the creation of sanitariums due to the warm climate. From 1894 to 1960, the Livermore Sanitarium was in operation for the treatment of alcoholism and mental disorders; and from 1918 to around 1960, the Arroyo del Valle Sanitarium was in operation in the town for the treatment of tuberculosis.

In 1909, the Livermore Carnegie Library and Park opened after taking advantage of a Carnegie library grant. As the city grew and larger libraries were needed, other libraries were built, and the original site was converted into a historic center and park.

In 1942, the U.S. government bought  of ranch land, bounded by Vasco and Greenville roads and East Avenue, and built the Livermore Naval Air Station. The primary mission of the base was to train Navy pilots. This facility operated until it was decommissioned in 1946 after the end of World War II. On 5 January 1951, the Bureau of Yards and Docks, U.S. Navy, formally transferred the former NAS Livermore in its entirety to the Atomic Energy Commission (AEC) for use by the University of California's Radiation Laboratory. In 1952, the government established Lawrence Livermore National Laboratory (LLNL), named after physicist Ernest O. Lawrence, as the site of a second laboratory for the study of nuclear energy like the research being done at the Los Alamos National Laboratory. The laboratory was run by the University of California. Edward Teller was a co-founder of LLNL and was both its director and associate director for many years. In 1956, the California campus of Sandia National Laboratories opened across East Avenue from LLNL. Both LLNL and Sandia are technically on U.S. government property just outside the city's jurisdiction limits, but with employment at LLNL at about 6,800 and Sandia/California at about 1,150 they are Livermore's largest employers.

Geography

The Livermore Valley has an east–west orientation with mountain passes on the west and east connecting the Bay Area and the Central Valley. The passes are used by railroads and highways to connect the two regions.

Watercourses draining the city of Livermore include Arroyo Mocho, Arroyo Valle, Arroyo Seco and Arroyo Las Positas. The principal aquifer underlying the city is the Mocho Subbasin. Several local seismic areas of activity lie near the city, including the Greenville Fault, Tesla Fault and the Livermore Fault.

The soil is primarily gravel with excellent drainage. The gravel is used in several gravel extraction sites outside the city. The gravelly soil and Mediterranean climate increases the flavor concentration in the grapes planted in the soil.

Climate

Livermore has a Mediterranean climate, although it is close to a semi-arid climate because of its relatively low annual precipitation being in a rain shadow of the East Bay hills. Livermore features hot, dry summers and mild to cool winters with occasional rainfall (Köppen climate classification Csa). The valley's passes direct the normal west to east flow of air through the valley. Usually there is a strong evening wind in the summer that brings cool air off the Pacific Ocean into the Livermore valley as it heads towards the much hotter Central Valley. The period from June to September is extremely dry and is characterized by clear skies. On rare occasion, subtropical moisture occasionally surges into the Livermore Valley in the late summer. This can bring high humidity, monsoon clouds, and, much less commonly, thunderstorms. 

Snow is very rare, but light dustings do occur on the surrounding hills and occasionally in the valley.

Demographics

U.S. 2010 Census

The 2010 United States Census reported that Livermore had a population of 80,968. The homeowner vacancy rate was 1.5%; the rental vacancy rate was 4.8%.  56,967 people (70.4% of the population) lived in owner-occupied housing units and 23,491 people (29.0%) lived in rental housing units.

According to the 2010 census information, Livermore is the third wealthiest midsize (between 65,000 and 249,999 people) city in the nation. In 2005, the median household income in Livermore was $96,632, which ranked it the third highest-income midsize city, behind only the California cities of Newport Beach ($97,428) and Livermore's western neighbor, Pleasanton ($101,022).

Economy

Laboratories
The Livermore area is the home of two US Department of Energy National Laboratories. The laboratories are known worldwide, and attract significant attention both for their scientific research and for their major roles in developing the United States nuclear arsenal.

The Lawrence Livermore National Laboratory (LLNL) is the largest employer in Livermore. LLNL's defining responsibility is to "ensure the safety, security and reliability of the nation’s nuclear deterrent," but it also does a wide variety of other research, including co-discovering livermorium.

Livermore is also the California site of Sandia National Laboratories, the second largest employer in livermore. It also describes itself as being focused on "national security". It is managed and operated by a subsidiary of Honeywell International.

i-GATE
In 2010, the two National Laboratories, along with other stakeholders, including the University of California, Berkeley, UC Davis, and regional cities, partnered to create the i-GATE (Innovation for Green Advanced Transportation Excellence) National Energy Systems Technology (NEST) Incubator, part of the Central Valley. The  i-GATE NEST campus was created to stimulate large-scale, high-tech business development drawn by the two labs. Initial focus of the campus was solar energy, fuel cells, biofuels, LED lighting, and other related technologies. i-GATE shares its facilities with the hackerspace Robot Garden, which provides public access on weekends.

Wine 

One of California's oldest wine regions, the Livermore Valley American Viticultural Area (AVA) played a pivotal role in shaping California's wine industry. In the 1840s, California pioneers looking for outstanding vineyard sites began planting grapes in the region. Robert Livermore planted the first commercial vines in the 1840s. After California joined the union as the 31st state in 1850, pioneer winemakers C. H. Wente, a first-generation immigrant from Germany (founder of Wente Vineyards), James Concannon, a first generation Irishman (founder of Concannon Vineyard), and Charles Wetmore, a Portland, Maine-born pioneer of California (founder of Cresta Blanca Winery), recognized the area's winegrowing potential and bought land, planted grapes and founded their wineries in the 1880s. 

Charles Wetmore went to France in 1878 when he was appointed a delegate for the California Viticultural Association to the Paris Exposition. Wetmore was able in 1882 to obtain Semillon, Sauvignon Blanc, and Muscat de Bordelais cuttings from one of the most prestigious vineyards in France, Chateau Yquem. These superior clones helped revitalize the California wine industry. In 1889 Wetmore won the grand prize for his first pressing (1884) in the 1889 Paris Exposition. Wetmore shared these cuttings with other growers, including C. H. Wente, who used the Chateau Yquem grape cuttings to eventually produce their Chateau Wente wine.

Top employers

According to the City's 2022 Annual Comprehensive Financial Report, the top employers in Livermore are:

Gillig Corporation, a large manufacturer of buses, moved its factory to Livermore in May 2017 and, at the time of the move, the company estimated its employment at the new facility to be 800 initially and 850 after the filling of then-open positions.

Livermore's largest employers, Lawrence Livermore National Laboratory and Sandia National Laboratory are United States Department of Energy National Laboratories, located inside the city limits since 2011, and are included in the above table.

Architectural Glass and Aluminum moved its headquarters to Livermore in 2013, with 80 employees. They expanded and changed to 100% employee ownership in 2015.

Arts and culture

Livermore's culture retains some vestiges of the farming, winegrowing and ranching traditions that have existed in the valley since the time of Robert Livermore, but now largely reflects a suburban population. Since 1918, Livermore has each June hosted the Livermore Rodeo, called the "World's Fastest Rodeo", that claims it has more riders per hour than any other event of its type. There are several wine-tasting tours of the many Livermore area wineries that occur periodically throughout the summer. This culture was documented in the photoessay Suburbia in 1973 by then-native photographer Bill Owens, with the photos shown in numerous exhibits.

Livermore was the only city in California to be awarded an All-America City Award during the annual National Civic League ceremony for 2021.  The theme of the 2021 awards was "Building Equitable and Resilient Communities."

Livermore has a strong blue-collar element, as well as many professionals who work at the Lawrence Livermore National Laboratory and other work sites in the high tech industries within the Bay Area. Recent housing development has included the addition of hundreds of million-dollar homes set among the southside's vineyards, as well as a multimillion-dollar renovation of the downtown area. Renovations included office buildings, the Livermore Cinemas, the Bankhead Theatre, and a multistory parking structure. The Livermore Civic Center includes a state-of-the-art library that opened in 2004, with a front mosaic by Maria Alquilar.

 Arts organizations supported by the city include the Livermore-Amador Symphony, Del Valle Fine Arts, producer of classical music events, and in the valley at large, the Valley Concert Chorale, Livermore Valley Opera, the Valley Dance Theatre, a classical ballet company and the Livermore Art Association.

 In 2019, a local LGBT organization, Livermore Pride, was founded. On its leadership team is Brittni Kiick, the city’s vice mayor and first openly LGBTQ+ councilmember.

 There are over 50 places of worship in Livermore.

 The first Camp Wonder, a summer camp for children with special medical needs, was opened in Livermore in 2001.

 One of the largest districts in Livermore is Springtown, the northeast area of the city north of Interstate 580. Originally conceived as a retirement community in the early 1960s, Springtown has slowly transformed into a community of young families and commuters from the greater Bay Area.  Along with the new population, comes a transformation and updating of the cookie-cutter homes, with many formerly 2/1 or 2/2 homes being converted into larger residences.   As of late 2017, the city is in the process of planning the future of the former Springtown Golf Course in conjunction with the LARPD.

 The downtown area or central district has two movie theaters, a community theater, and space for open-air concerts. The North Livermore district is north of the Union Pacific Railroad that cuts through downtown. The South Livermore district, including areas of unincorporated land, has over 40 wineries.

World's longest-lasting light bulb 

The city is noted for one world record. A 120+ year old 4-watt light bulb, called the Centennial Light, housed in the Livermore-Pleasanton Fire Department main station, is still burning. Originally installed by Augustus Donner Wilson, the bulb has been maintained through successive generations until his great-great granddaughter  Alissa Wilson. It glows dimly, but still functions as a light bulb. The Guinness Book of World Records, Ripley's Believe It or Not!, and General Electric have concluded that the bulb has been burning continuously since 1901 with the exception of power failures and the three times it was disconnected for moves to new stations. The light bulb was manufactured by the Shelby Electric Company and was hand blown with a carbon filament.

Parks and recreation

The Livermore Area Recreation and Park District (LARPD) is a special independent park district that was created by the vote of the public in 1947 and runs the parks and other facilities in the city of Livermore and most of the unincorporated areas of eastern Alameda County. LARPD operates 42 facilities, including neighborhood, special use, community and regional parks and sport fields, a family campground at South Lake Tahoe, the Ravenswood Historic Site, The Barn, the Veterans Building, the Carnegie Building, the Bothwell Recreation Center and the new Robert Livermore Community Center. LARPD runs the May Nissen Community Park and Swim Center at 685 Rincon Ave and is open to swimmers with a $0.50 admission price from mid-June through end of August—closed Sundays. May Nissen Park includes a tot lot, group picnic area, barbecue pits, picnic tables, preschool, basketball court, restrooms, horseshoe pits, softball areas, tennis courts, two swimming pools, and a dog park. Max Baer Park has been the home of the Intermediate Little League World Series since 2013.

Brushy Peak Regional Preserve, located near Livermore, is jointly operated by the Livermore Area Recreation and Park District and the East Bay Regional Park District.

The extensive gravel deposits around Livermore have led to extensive gravel extraction that is still ongoing. Shadow Cliffs Park along Stanley Boulevard west of Livermore is a popular  park that includes an  lake in an old Kaiser Industries gravel pit and is used extensively today for swimming, boating, and fishing.

The parking/entrance fee is $6 per vehicle and $4 more per trailered boat. The park opens at 6 AM in the summer and 7 AM in the winter. The lake is used by sailboats, sailboards and fishing boats as well as recreational swimmers.

Del Valle Park has the eastern gateway to the Ohlone Wilderness Trail, a  scenic back country hiking trail. The Del Valle Family Campground has 150 sites, 21 of them with water and sewage, and electrical hook-ups. Picnicking sites are available.

It runs an extensive selection of classes on a wide variety of subjects. LARPD has its own, five-person board of directors that is elected by the citizens to staggered four-year terms and meets at 7 p.m. on the second and last Wednesday of each month inside the Cresta Blanca Ballroom at the Robert Livermore Community Center, 4444 East Avenue. They are paid $100/meeting with a maximum of $500/month. The General Manager of LARPD is Timothy Barry—selected by the board and paid $137,160/yr plus unspecified benefits including Alameda County retirement plan (ACERA) with 29.13% of LARPD salary contribution rate to a well paid retirement plan. In addition, there are 13 paid holidays, vacation, sick leave, medical, dental, life insurance, etc. adding about $55,000/yr in benefits to the General Manager's salary. The organization and facilities are extensive and LARPD hires many part-time workers (up to about 430 at peak times) from Park Rangers to referees in its extensive programs and classes with a permanent staff of about 63. The 2012-2013 operating budget of LARPD is $16,393,564 plus a capital budget of $3,870,971. Their source of operating income is property taxes, user fees, charges and grants. Unfortunately, the state has cut down on their share of property taxes as the state re-allocate more to itself and their never ending fiscal crisis's. LARPD serves an area that encompasses about 115,000 people.

Government 

Livermore is run by a council–manager government with a four-member City Council elected for four years plus a two-year elected mayor and a "professional" City Manager. The council meets at 7 p.m. the second and fourth Mondays of each month at Council Chambers, 3575 Pacific Ave., Livermore. Twice a month they hear citizen input and presumably relay this information to the City manager who actually runs the city day to day.

The mayor of Livermore is John Marchand, who was elected in 2022 and previously served as mayor from 2011 to 2020. The vice mayor is Brittni Kiick, who was first elected in 2020 and represents District 3. Other councilmembers include Evan Branning, who represents District 1; Ben Barrientos, who represents District 2; and Bob Carling, who represents District 4.

The mayor is paid $1,400 per month and the other council members are paid $980 per month. In addition they are eligible for a $90 per month cell phone allotment and health care benefits up to a maximum of $2,119/month plus other city paid insurance and retirement contributions to CaLPERS or PARS ARS of which the city pays 18% or 1.3% of their salary, respectively.

The City Manager, Marianna Marysheva, was nominally hired by the city council for a five-year term and can, in principle, be fired by them if needed. Marysheva is paid a salary of $196,320/year with about $64,500/year medical, insurance and retirement benefits paid by the city. The City Manager has a staff of five to assist her.

The City Attorney, Jason Alcala, is hired by the City Council and generally handles all legal matters for the city, from traffic tickets to civil lawsuits to acting as a general counsel, giving legal advice to city departments.

Unions and bargaining units representing the 451 Livermore City Employees:
 Livermore Management Group
 Association of Livermore Employees (ALE)
 Police Management
 Police Officers Association
 Livermore-Pleasanton Firefighters (IAFF)

Nearly all have their own union agreements and retirement systems which in general cost at least city paid: $7,500 per year for health benefits, life and AD&D insurance, short and long term disability Insurance, 1.45% medicare, 18.1% of salary contribution for retirement benefits which can be used at age 55 at a rate of 2.7% times years of service time salary or 3.0% times years of service times salary at age 50 for police officers, 100% of health insurance paid after retirement with 25 or more years of service, tuition and 75% text book reimbursement, uniform allowance, 80–192 hours of vacation per year, 12 paid holidays per year, etc. 

As of October 2019, there were 53,792 registered voters in Livermore; of these, 21,158 (39.93%) are Democrats, 15,061 (28.00%) are Republicans, and 14,499 (26.95%) are independents/decline to state.

In the United States House of Representatives, Livermore is in California's 14th congressional district, represented by Democrat Eric Swalwell

General Plan Update: Imagine Livermore 2045
In September 2021, the City of Livermore began its General Plan update process.  Also known as Imagine Livermore 2045, this is a multi-year update to the General Plan that includes public outreach and a General Plan Advisory Committee appointed by City Council.

Education

Public schools
The public schools in Livermore are part of the Livermore Valley Joint Unified School District (LVJUSD), with headquarters at 685 East Jack London Blvd.

The district has 11 elementary (K-5 and K-8) schools, three middle schools (grades 6-8), two comprehensive high schools, and three alternative high schools. As of the 2012–2013 school year, the public school superintendent was Kelly Bowers, who was hired by the elected school board in 2010.

The five members of the Board of Education are elected to alternating four year terms by the voters of the community. Each December, the board reorganizes itself by selecting a board president and clerk of the board. The president of the board (2015) is Craig Bueno. Chuck Rogge is the clerk of the board, while Anne White, Bill Dunlop and Thomas McLaughlin are board members. They hold regular public meetings on the first and third Tuesday of the month at 7:00 p.m. in the School Board Room at 685 East Jack London Blvd.

High schools
 Livermore High School, established in 1891 as California's first union high school
 Granada High School, Livermore's second high school

Alternative schools
 Del Valle and Phoenix Continuation High Schools, two schools sharing one building since 2004
 Vineyard High School an alternative independent study school

Adult education
 Livermore Adult School, 1401 Almond Ave., Livermore

Other schools

Pre-schools and day care
Livermore has about 30 pre-schools and day care centers.

Charter schools
There were two charter schools in Livermore, one K-8 and one high school, both operated by the Tri-Valley Learning Corporation, a local 501(c)3 not-for-profit organization formed by the parents and teachers who founded the two charter schools. 
 Livermore Valley Charter School (LVCS): a K-8 public school
 Livermore Valley Charter Preparatory (LVCP): Livermore's newest high school, opened in fall of 2010

Both schools were effectively shut down by the beginning of the 2018 school year amidst accusations of embezzlement, exchange student fraud, and the loss of their UC accreditation. The displaced students were absorbed by the new Lawernce Elementary school and Las Positas Community College Middle College.

Private schools
 Our Savior Lutheran School (OSLS)
 St. Michael's Elementary and Middle Catholic School
 Valley Montessori
 Livermore Valley Academy
 King's Classical Academy

Colleges and universities
Las Positas College

The Hertz Foundation for scholarships is based in Livermore.

Media
Radio station KKIQ is licensed in Livermore and broadcasts in the Tri-Valley area.

The Independent is a local newspaper founded in September 1963. It is located in the Bank of Italy Building.

Infrastructure

Transportation 

Interstate 580 is Livermore's primary east–west six-lane freeway. I-580 passes the outskirts of Livermore before it heads east through the Altamont Pass to the Central Valley and Interstate 5. I-580 and I-5 are the main route of San Francisco Bay Area to Los Angeles truck shipping traffic. Highway 84 heads southwest from I-580 to Fremont. Vasco Road, an unnumbered highway that is maintained by Alameda and Contra Costa counties, connects Livermore to Brentwood and the Sacramento–San Joaquin River Delta area.

It is the main airport in the Tri-Valley area. Approximately 600 aircraft are based on Livermore Airport, which has over 150,000 annual aircraft landings and take-offs each year. The airfield is accessible 24 hours a day and is attended by city employees during the hours listed under "Airport Services". The staffed air traffic control tower is operated by Federal Aviation Administration (FAA) employees daily from 7:00 A.M. until 9:00 P.M. There is an open airshow which is held annually on the first Saturday of October from 10:00 AM to 4:00 PM showing vintage World War II aircraft and other displays.

The WHEELS bus system operates in Livermore, Pleasanton, Dublin, and the surrounding unincorporated areas of Alameda County. It has connections to Bay Area Rapid Transit (BART) stations in Dublin and Pleasanton.

Livermore has two stations for the Altamont Corridor Express (ACE), a commuter train which runs from Stockton to the San Jose area. One station is at Vasco Road, and the other is in downtown Livermore at its Transit Center. The Transit Center has a free multistory parking garage and connections to the WHEELS bus system.

There was a petition drive to bring the Bay Area Rapid Transit system to Livermore led by a group founded by Linda Jeffery Sailors, the former mayor of Dublin who was successful in extending BART to Dublin/Pleasanton (the closest station to Livermore at that time). In May 2018, the BART board of directors voted against extending BART to Livermore. As a result, the Tri-Valley-San Joaquin Valley Regional Rail Authority was formed to establish a rail connection between the existing BART system and the Altamont Corridor Express. The service, known as Valley Link, intends to build new rail stations at Isabel Avenue and Greenville Road for service.

Police 
The Livermore Police Department (LPD) was established in 1876, at that time the only law enforcement agency in the San Francisco Bay Area besides the San Francisco Police Department. The LPD has 135 members including 90 sworn officers and 45 non-sworn full-time personnel who operate on a $25 million budget each year.

Fire department 

The Livermore-Pleasanton Fire Department provides fire and advanced life support services to the cities of Livermore and Pleasanton. In 2008 the LPFD responded to approximately 11,000 calls for service. The International Association of Fire Fighters (IAFF) Local 1974 represents its 112 members.

Notable people

Mikkel Aaland, digital photographer
Louie Aguiar, football player
Kristin Allen, gymnast
Max Baer, heavyweight champion boxer
Conrad Bain (1923-2013), actor
Sonny Barger, outlaw biker and actor
Bob Beers, Nevada state senator
Jason Lyle Black, classical pianist
Ben Bodé, actor
Harold Brown, director of Lawrence Livermore National Laboratory and United States Secretary of Defense
Bryn Davies, musician
Mark Davis, Major League Baseball pitcher, Granada High School (1978)
Troy Dayak, soccer player, San Jose Earthquakes Hall of Fame inductee
James DePaiva, actor
Matt Finders, trombonist
Duane Glinton, Turks & Caicos Islands football midfielder
J. R. Graham, Major League Baseball pitcher
Martin Harrison, football defensive end for San Francisco 49ers, Minnesota Vikings and Seattle Seahawks, active 1990-1999
Brian Johnson, soccer player
Randy Johnson (Livermore High 1982), Major League Baseball pitcher for Montreal Expos, Seattle Mariners, Houston Astros, Arizona Diamondbacks, New York Yankees, and San Francisco Giants, 1988–2009, Baseball Hall of Fame inductee
Tara Kemp, singer
Robert Livermore, town namesake (died before the city was named and incorporated)
Hans Mark, physicist and United States Secretary of the Air Force
Ralph Merkle, pioneer in modern cryptography
George H. Miller, director of Lawrence Livermore National Laboratory
Bill Mooneyham, Major League Baseball pitcher for Oakland A's
Erwin Mueller (1944-2018), basketball player with Chicago Bulls, Los Angeles Lakers, and Seattle SuperSonics in 1960s and Detroit Pistons in the 1970s
Bill Owens, photographer of Livermore's suburbs, in the book Suburbia
Ronald "Ron" Oliveira, businessman and current CEO of Revolut USA 
Danny Payne, soccer player
Connie Post, first poet laureate of Livermore
Jean Quan, mayor of Oakland
James Wesley Rawles, best-selling novelist
Judith Merkle Riley, author
Shelby Robertson, artist
Michael Rodrigues, gymnast
Brandon Rogers, YouTuber, comedian
Syamyon Sharetski, the last acting chairman of the Supreme Soviet of Belarus, President of Belarus (acting since 1999)
Bryan Shaw (Livermore High 2005), Major League Baseball pitcher for Arizona Diamondbacks 2011–2012, and Cleveland Indians 2013-present
Jon Stebbins, author
Brad Stisser, soccer player
Edward Teller, physicist, director of Lawrence Livermore National Laboratory
Steven L. Thompson, author, journalist, historian, former motorcycle racer
Jack Trudeau, football player
Brock Van Wey, electronic musician
Tim Weaver, soccer player
Jill Whelan, actress
Herb York, first director of Lawrence Livermore National Laboratory

Sister cities
Livermore has three sister cities, as designated by Sister Cities International: 
 Quetzaltenango, Guatemala
 Snezhinsk, Russia. Citizens of Snezhinsk came to Livermore to teach children about the effects of drugs, join the Livermore Rodeo, and form a Rotary Club.
 Yotsukaidō, Japan. Both Livermore and Yotsukaido have a student exchange program. In April 2008, a concert was held in celebration of the relationship of the cities.

See also

References

Print, photo and film resources on Livermore
 Livermore (2002), a film by Rachel Raney and David Murray
 Suburbia, photoessay by Owens, Bill (1972),

External links

 

 
Cities in Alameda County, California
Livermore Valley
Boot Hill cemeteries
California wine
El Camino Viejo
Populated places established in 1876
1876 establishments in California
Cities in the San Francisco Bay Area
Incorporated cities and towns in California